Tonga competed in the 2014 Commonwealth Games in Glasgow, Scotland from 23 July – 3 August 2014. The country was represented by sixteen athletes in five sports. Participating in their ninth Commonwealth Games, Tonga won a total of three bronze medals during previous editions. Boxers Uaine Fa and Lomalito Moala, bronze medallists in 2010, competed in Glasgow.

Athletics

Men
Track & road events

Key
Note–Ranks given for track events are within the athlete's heat only
Q = Qualified for the next round
q = Qualified for the next round as a fastest loser or, in field events, by position without achieving the qualifying target
NR = National record
N/A = Round not applicable for the event

Boxing

Men

Diving

Women

Swimming

Men

Women

Weightlifting

Men

Women

References

Nations at the 2014 Commonwealth Games
Tonga at the Commonwealth Games
2014 in Tongan sport